The Sports Network was a wire service providing sports information in real time. Based in Hatboro, Pennsylvania, The Sports Network was especially noted for its coverage of the NCAA's Football Championship Subdivision in college football; it presented that group's major end-of-season awards—the Walter Payton Award for the top offensive player, the Buck Buchanan Award for the top defensive player, the Jerry Rice Award for the top freshman and the Eddie Robinson Award for the top coach. It served a list of clients that included Viacom, Yahoo, and the Canadian television channel The Sports Network, and was a partner with United Press International.

Lawsuit
The Sports Network sued Disney in May 2004 over Disney-owned ESPN's illicit usage of Minor League Baseball data and statistics.  Both sides settled in January 2005.

Site attack
In April 2008, The Sports Network's online services were shut down for several days by PRC hackers.

Acquisition
On February 10, 2015, The Sports Network was acquired by STATS LLC and its Hatboro headquarters were closed in July 2015.

References

Sports mass media in the United States